John Bán Gallagher is an Irish former Gaelic footballer who played for Na Cealla Beaga and the Donegal county team.

Playing career
Bán Gallagher won the 1987 Ulster Under-21 Football Championship and the 1987 All-Ireland Under-21 Football Championship with Donegal.

He went on to play for the senior county team in both league and championship. He made a late substitute appearance for Brian Murray against Armagh in the 1990 Ulster Senior Football Championship final, won by Donegal. He kicked the winner in the 1995–96 National Football League semi-final against Cork at Croke Park; the victory meant Donegal played in that season's final.

When his club reached the final of the 1991 Ulster Senior Club Football Championship, he was injured ahead of the game.

Personal life
Bán Gallagher's son Eoghan also played for Na Cealla Beaga and Donegal.

Honours
Donegal
 Ulster Senior Football Championship: 1990
 All-Ireland Under-21 Football Championship: 1987
 Ulster Under-21 Football Championship: 1987

References

Year of birth missing (living people)
Living people
Donegal inter-county Gaelic footballers
Killybegs Gaelic footballers